Dipterocarpus ochraceus is a tropical rainforest tree endemic to Sabah. It is known from the ultramafic hills in the Ranau district.

Description
Dipterocarpus ochraceus grows up to 45 meters high, with a trunk up to 1.2 meters in diameter.

Range and habitat
Dipterocarpus ochraceus grows on ridges in hill forests from 600 to 900 meters elevation, typically on ultramafic soils of intermediate fertility. It is typically an emergent tree, rising above the forest canopy. It is absent from the Gymnostoma-dominated forests  which grow on the most nutrient-scarce ultramafic soils, and also absent from hill dipterocarp forests on more fertile soils where Shorea parvistipulata is predominant.

References

ochraceus
Endemic flora of Borneo
Trees of Borneo
Flora of Sabah
Flora of the Borneo lowland rain forests